Gonzalo Andrés Villagra Lira (born 17 September 1981) was a Chilean footballer.

Career statistics

Honours

Club
Unión Española
 Primera División de Chile (1): 2013 Transición

References

External links
 

1981 births
Living people
Chilean footballers
Chile under-20 international footballers
Club Deportivo Universidad Católica footballers
Universidad de Concepción footballers
Unión Española footballers
Club Deportivo Palestino footballers
C.D. Antofagasta footballers
Santiago Morning footballers
Chilean Primera División players
Association football midfielders